Indira Meena (born 31 October 1987) is a member of the Rajasthan Legislative Assembly from Bamanwas constituency.

References

Living people
Place of birth missing (living people)
Women members of the Rajasthan Legislative Assembly
Rajasthan MLAs 2018–2023
1987 births
21st-century Indian women politicians